Stefan Keller (born 1961) is a Swiss classical and jazz flute player and composer. He plays all kind of flutes like Quartertone,  Glissando, Bebe, alto flute, and bass flute. Most unusual is his contrabass flute made by Kotato and Fukushima. All these instruments are also electronic flutes. One of his specialties is live looping. His actual solo performance called "Albido" works with the electronic flutes and different loop gear like Electrix Repeater and Gibson Echoplex Digital Pro.

External links 

Swiss composers
Swiss male composers
Swiss jazz flautists
Swiss classical flautists
Living people
1961 births
Male jazz musicians